Theonesios I was a King of Characene, a vassal state of the Parthian empire and important trading port on the Persian Gulf. His rule was from 25/24BC to 19/18BC.  

He is known only from his silver Tetradrachms, which exhibits various spelling of his name.

References
 

Kings of Characene
1st-century BC monarchs in the Middle East
Year of birth missing
1st-century deaths
Year of death missing